A41 may refer to:
 A41, War Office Inventions Branch
 A41 (album), a studio album by All-4-One
 Queen's Pawn Game, Encyclopaedia of Chess Openings code
 Samsung Galaxy A41, a smartphone
 Vultee XA-41, an American World War II attack prototype

Roads
 A41 road (England), a road connecting London and Birkenhead
 A41 motorway (France), a road connecting Grenoble and the A40